Jai Akash, also known as Akash, is an Indian actor, who acted as hero in Telugu and Tamil films. He has acted in a Kannada film as hero too. He is the hero of the Telugu blockbuster movie Anandam Anandam (2001).

Career
Jai Sathish, a Tamilian of Sri Lankan origin settled in London, sent his modelling photographs to the "Star Search" service run by Suhasini's entertainment portal website TamilTalkies.com during the late 1990s. K. Balachander, when casting a new actor to portray the second hero role in Rojavanam (1999), used the "Star Search" platform and selected him to be in the film under the stage name of Akash.

Akash began his career with his first film in Telugu, Anandam, directed by Sreenu Vaitla and produced by Ramoji Rao. Anandam was a Silver Jubilee film and Akash won many awards for his excellent natural acting. He was the overnight super star and many top producers and directors were in queue to sign him. But, Akash acted in new directors films and struggling producers films. He acted in several Telugu films including June July opposite Sadha,"Pillistae Palukkutha" opposite Shamitha Shetty, directed by Kodi Ramakrishna and the songs composed by Bahubali Fame M.M.Keeravani became super hit. Especially, the song Manasa Ottu Maatadothu" . He returned to Tamil as a lead with the film Inidhu Inidhu Kadhal Inidhu (2003) opposite Neha, which was a remake of Anandam, also produced by Ramoji Rao. He was credited as Jai Akash due to presence of Aravind Akash, an actor with a similar name.  In 2004, he teamed up with Sreenu Vaitla again in Anandamanandamaye. He also starred in six Tamil films between 2004 and 2005; Ramakrishna, Kicha Vayasu 16, Gurudeva, Sevvel, Amudhae and Kaatrullavarai. The Tamil films he acted as hero were with all the top directors, such as Agathiyan and Ezhil but the films didn't get the proper release.

Jai Akash returned to the Telugu film industry as a second hero and acted in three films produced by Super Good Films with Andala Ramudu (2006), Nava Vasantham (2007) and Gorintaku (2008). All the three films became super hit and Akash got many offers as hero in Telugu. He acted and directed a film called "Sweet Heart", which got good reviews for Akash acting and direction. In 2009, he acted in the romantic story, Adada Enna Azhagu. In the bilingual movie Vandae Maatharam (2010), he played alongside Mammootty and Arjun Sarja along with a huge array of actors in supporting roles. Jai Akash returns after a gap and is both acting in and directing this film Ayudha Porattam (2011), which deals with the issue of arms supply to the island nation of Sri Lanka. Kadhalan Kadhali (2011), Yuganiki Okka Premikudu (2012), Mr. Rajesh (2013) and  Aa Iddaru (2013) are the films in which he acted as a hero and also worked as the director. In the Telugu film Mr. Rajesh, he acted in seven roles.

In 2020, Jai Akash acted as the hero in soap opera Tamil's Neethane Enthan Ponvasantham which premiered on 24 February 2020, has successfully completed 300 episodes on 12 May.

Controversy
In 2005, Jai Akash's Gurudeva released, but the film didn't become a commercial success. The Telugu version of the film, Guru, also failed with Muppa Ankanna Rao, the executive producer of the version, failing to promote the film. Akash complained at the producer council, that his film was killed by the producer purposely.

In 2009, Jai Akash filed a complaint to the Nadigar Sangam against actress Sunaina for not giving dates to complete his film "Madhan". He brought Sunaina from the Telugu film industry as a newcomer to the Tamil film industry and allowed her to act in "Kadhazhil Vizunthen", while she was on his contract, but Sunaina demanded more payment after the success of her film. Denying such reports, Jai Akash complained that Sunaina doesn't have any gratitude as he is the one that introduced her into the Tamil film industry and that he allowed her to act in Kadhalil Vizhunthen (2008) when she was in his contract. But, after the film became hit, she is not giving him dates to finish his film.

Filmography
Films

As distributor
''Oruthal (2016)

Television

Awards

References

External links
 

Living people
Indian male film actors
Male actors in Tamil cinema
Male actors in Telugu cinema
Male actors in Kannada cinema
21st-century Indian film directors
Tamil film directors
1981 births